The LNB Pro B Finals Most Valuable Player (MVP) Award is an annual professional basketball award that is given by the second tier division in France, the LNB Pro B. It is awarded to the best player in a given finals series of the playoffs.

Winners

References

External links
Official Site 
Eurobasket.com - France

LNB Pro B awards
European basketball awards
Basketball most valuable player awards